Vilia (formerly Eidyllia, Ειδυλλία) is a village and a former municipality of West Attica, Greece. Since the 2011 local government reform it is part of the municipality Mandra-Eidyllia, of which it is a municipal unit. Its population was 1,753 at the 2011 census. It is part of Athens metropolitan area. The inhabitants of Vilia are Arvanites.

Geography

The municipal unit Vilia covers the mountainous northwestern part of Attica, and has a land area of 144.851 km². The main mountain ranges are Cithaeron (1,409 m) in the northwest and Pastra in the northeast. In the west it stretches along the coast of the Alkyonides Gulf, a bay of the Gulf of Corinth. The village Vilia, the largest in the municipal unit, lies in the easternmost part, at the southeastern foot of Cithaeron. Vilia is 6 km south of Erythres, 7 km west of Oinoi, 10 km east of the coastal village Aigosthena, 17 km south of Thebes and 40 km northwest of Athens.

The municipal unit's largest villages are Vilia (pop. 1,269 in 2011), Kato Alepochori (220), Aigosthena (80), Veniza (52), and Agios Nektarios (40).

Subdivisions

The municipal unit Vilia consists of the following villages:
Vilia 
Agia Paraskevi 
Agios Konstantinos 
Agios Nektarios 
Aigosthena (also Porto Germeno)
Ano Alepochori
Veniza
Kato Alepochori
Kryo Pigadi
Loumpa
Mytikas
Profitis Ilias
Psatha

Historical population

Notable people 
Ellie Lambeti (1926–1983) actress

References

External links
Official website 
West Attica
Historical references of the town of Vilia
Vilia (municipality) on GTP Travel Pages (in English and Greek)

Populated places in West Attica
Arvanite settlements